PS Waterford was a passenger vessel built for the Great Western Railway in 1874.

History

PS Waterford was built by William Simons and Company of Renfrew and launched in 1874 for the Great Western Railway. She was placed on the Milford Haven to Waterford route with her sister ships PS Milford and PS Limerick.

She was scrapped in 1905 at Garston.

References

1874 ships
Passenger ships of the United Kingdom
Paddle steamers of the United Kingdom
Steamships of the United Kingdom
Ships built on the River Clyde
Ships of the Great Western Railway